The Pacific National University (PNU) is a public university in Khabarovsk, Russia. Established in 1958, PNU has over 21,000 students in 54 academic majors.

History 
The Pacific National University (PNU) started as the Khabarovsk Automobile Highway Institute, founded by the USSR Ministry of Higher Education on March 29, 1958. M. P. Danilovsky served as president for the following 30 years. The main building, the laboratory, and the dormitory buildings were the first to be built. The initial enrollment was approximately 150 students. The institute offered majors in industrial, highway and civil engineering, motor transport, construction, and highway machines and equipment. 

By 1962, the institute had departments of engineering, mechanical engineering, automobile engineering, highway engineering, and forest engineering, totaling five departments. Students were trained in 10 majors. By that time the enrollment increased to 1150 students. On July 12, 1962, the Khabarovsk Automobile Highway Institute was renamed the Khabarovsk Poly-technical Institute. The first engineering students graduated in 1963.

In 1967, the construction of campus buildings was finished. By that time, Khabarovsk Poly-technical Institute had departments of mechanical engineering, engineering, chemical engineering, automobile engineering, highway engineering, forest engineering, national economy, evening studies, extra-mural, and general technical (Blagoveshchensk city).

The university trained engineering students in 18 majors. In 1975, a branch of the Institute was founded in Magadan, Russia. 

In December 1992, Khabarovsk Poly-technical Institute became Khabarovsk State University of Technology. On March 23, 2005, Khabarovsk State University became Pacific National University. On March 10, 2009, PNU became a member of the Eurasian Association of Universities.

Current structure 
As of 2021, PNU has eight institutes. These are the Far East Highway Institute, the Far East Institute of Forest Industry, the Far East Law Institute, the Institute of Architecture and Civil Engineering, the Institute of Information Technologies, the Institute of Automotive and Power Engineering, the Institute of Economics and Management and the Far Eastern Institute of Branch Technologies, Management, Business and Law (Department for Extension and Parallel Training; Extra-Mural Department for Extension Training; Department for Further Professional Training).
PNU also has three departments. These are the International Studies Department, the Department of Mathematical Modelling and Control Processes and the Extra-Mural Department.

In November 2009, PNU had over 21,000 students in 61 majors of basic higher professional education, 32 Bachelor's degree programs, 26 Master's degree programs, and 40 scientific majors of postgraduate education. There were 900 faculty members at PNU, including 102 full professors and over 426 associate professors.

Research activities

More than 20 internationally recognized scientific schools have been established at PNU. PNU scientific researches are carried out in physical and mathematical sciences, including Theoretical Nuclear Physics, Information and Telecommunication Technologies, Nanotechnologies, Materials Science, Mechanical Engineering, Architecture and Urban Planning, Sociology, Economics, and Jurisprudence.

Recently, PNU scientists got world-level results of research projects in Mathematics, Nuclear Theory, Thermal Conductivity Modelling, Kinetics of Combustion Processes, Software and Data Communications, Probability Theory, Magneto Optic Phenomena within the frames of fundamental research. There were also created Mathematical Models, Algorithms, Software Tools of Submerged Images Processing, and there investigated the Effect of a Nanosecond Electromagnetic Pulse Irradiation on Physical Properties of Alloys.

The main fields of applied researches are the following: Measuring, Calculation and Control Devices; Information Processing Systems; Computer-Based Information Systems Design; Development of Robot Systems, including Submerged Robotics; Applied Materials Science; Improvement of Technological Processes and Machines and Mechanisms Engineering; Improving the Efficiency of Transportation Using and Improvement of its Operating Characteristics; Engineering of Logging Technologies and Timber Processing; Problems of Sustainable Use of Natural Resources and Environmental Protection; Forest Reserve Restoration; Alternative Energy Sources Generation; Design of Industrial and Civil Buildings and Constructions; Development of Modern Construction Technologies and Operation of Transport Facilities.

Annually more than 600 scientific papers that cover the results of PNU scientific research are published in leading Russian and foreign journals and paper collections of international conferences. Continuous development of material and technical basis of the university and use of modern scientific equipment contributes to the increase of research effectiveness. There are more than 20 laboratories, more than 20 Scientific-Educational and Engineering Centers and 2 students’ Design Engineering Bureaus at PNU.

The university pays great attention to the development of innovation activity associated with realization of research works (RW) results by the industrial enterprises and also tries to make professional and teaching staff engaged in applied researches. During the last years, PNU has established a number of innovative subdivisions: Innovation and Technology Center, Technology Transfer Center in Khabarovsky krai, Impulse Center, Nonprofit Partnership “Far Eastern Technology Transfer Center”. There was also implemented the project of Students’ Business Incubator.

The results of many applied research works were realized by Far Eastern industrial enterprises such as the "Komsomolsk-on-Amur Aircraft Production Association" named after Yuri Gagarin (KnAAPO) which is included in corporation “Suhoi”, Khabarovsk and Komsomolsk-on-Amur petroleum refineries, JSC “Far Eastern Generating Company”, enterprises involved in Offshore Oil and Gas Exploration Projects the Sakhalin-1 and Sakhalin-2 and by other enterprises. The University teams of researchers actively participate in various competitions for conducting research within the framework of the Federal Target Programs, Scientific and Technical Programs, Grants in different scientific fields (grants and programs of Federal Agency for Education and Federal Agency for Science and Innovation, The Russian Foundation for Basic Research).

Annually research projects of PNU scientists are presented at Major International Scientific and Technical Exhibitions, including the Moscow International Salon of Innovations and Investments, International Exhibition & Congress “High Technologies. Innovation. Investments” (St. Petersburg), Moscow International Salon of Industrial Property “Archimedes” (Moscow). Annually, PNU staff and teams of researchers have received more than 50 patents, certificates of registration of computer programs. The effectiveness of obtaining patent protection is 80 percent of number of applications for inventions and utility models. In total, PNU scientists submitted 298 inventions and utility models for patenting and obtained 259 patents between 2000 and 2008.

The Department of Industrial and Intellectual Property provides legal protection of research results at the university. In 2008 the Regional Patent and Reference Information Centre was established at PNU in the frames of project “The Development of Nanotechnology Industry Infrastructure in Russian Federation in 2008-2010”. Its primary functions are to provide advisory services on intellectual property (IP) protection; to provide access to databases of State System of Scientific and Technical Information; to carry out analytical, patent research; methodological and consulting support for registration of IP Rights. PNU Ph.D. degree program is conducted in 40 majors, including 5 majors appeared in 2007 -2008. PNU Doctorate degree program is conducted in 7 majors.

There are 6 dissertation councils at PNU, which work in 11 majors. The university is a co-founder of four joint dissertation councils. These councils were established on the basis of other higher educational institutions and work in 7 majors. During last three years there were defended 3 doctoral theses 76 PhD theses at PNU dissertational councils.

Every year over 3,000 students participate in student research work (SRW) events. They participate in all-Russia contests and competitions, inter-university conferences, and international competitions. During last five years students submitted more than 1,000 research papers for the different contests and received more than 600 diplomas, awards, letter of commendation for the participation in the contests, competitions, conferences and exhibitions.

Information Technology
Pacific National University has a modern information and education complex that includes:
 Local university interior network
 External distributed network
 Automated control system of the education process
 Automated control system of the university
 Electronic documentation system
 Informational - library complex

There are 2200 computers and 40 computerized classrooms at PNU, where practical training in information technologies majors are conducted. There are many classes with installed interactive whiteboards. The university has its own maintenance and repairing service. More than 1,750 computers are connected to the LAN. 40 servers and 110 units of network equipment are a constituent part of the united network.

PNU informatization department developed and realized project of informatization systems of complex automation of the University administrative, educational and scientific activities (IASU PNU). Internet system of distance learning is developing: a data portal was created, through which the system of knowledge delivery was organized; currently Educational and Methodical Complex of 470 the Disciplines is available on website. There was created system of intermediate control of knowledge by means of adaptive testing system AST-3, where offered test for passing 470 examinations and credits. There is also offered client-server system for on-line passing examinations and credits. There is developed and successfully applied the technology of operative creation of electronic textbooks and courses of lectures in chm , DjVu, PDF formats. Today, more than 3500 students of Extra-Mural Department and Extra-Mural Department for Extension Training actively use the data portal and AST-3 system in educational process.

Pacific National University is actively involved in the informatization process of educational system at the regional level. These problems are solved by the University subdivision - Khabarovsk Regional Center of New Information Technologies (KRC NIT). PNU communication center (the KRC NIT unit) provides a sure high-speed access to Russian educational networks (RUNNet and RBNet) and international educational networks (GLORIAD), to the Internet, as well as to the regional educational resources for all PNU subdivisions.

In addition, the PNU communication center provides management and technical support to the telecommunication industry network of science and higher education institutions of Khabarovsky krai and provides functioning of Khabarovsk Regional Educational Information Network (KREIN). KREIN includes about 290 schools of Khabarovsky krai, 21 posts of the inter-school methodical centers system, three approbation centers of the secondary education system, leading institutions of higher education and research institutes, the Ministry of Education and 15 departments of education in districts of Khabarovsky krai, a number of Khabarovsk colleges.

There was designed portal Paydeyya at PNU to form a regional educational content and create Internet sites for the regional educational telecommunication projects. This portal was designed for students’ of general and professional educational institutions usage, lecturers in general and special subjects, parents and educational community. There are presented and regularly replenished materials for students (materials for self-training, self-testing), materials for teachers and lecturers (general and particular subject matters, didactic materials) and special educational programs (extramural courses, contests and competitions, home training) in the portal.

In 2009 a computer cluster was put into commission at PNU to conduct research in various fields of applied mathematics, theoretical physics, modeling of various processes, economics, and to use in educational process for a number of majors at PNU.

The journal Information Science and Control Systems is published with the active assistance of PNU scientists. The creator and chief editor of the journal is Evgeny Eremin, Vice-President for Research and Informatization, Doctor of Engineering.
In October 2009, the analytical survey “Apply of Automated Control Systems to Institutions of Higher Professional Education activities in Russian Federation” was prepared in the State Institute of Information Technologies and Telecommunications "Informika" on the basis of research of automated control systems (ACS) in 673 Russian state and municipal institutions of higher education.

Pacific National University became one of the 55 best Russian institutions of higher education that received the highest scores in all examined ACS areas.

PNU Scientific Library
The PNU Scientific Library is the largest among the university libraries in the region. It is the Regional Methodical Centre for 94 state and commercial libraries of institutions of higher education and specialized secondary educational institutions in Khabarovsky krai and Amur Oblast. PNU Scientific Library is a member of ARLICON (Association of Regional Library Consortia), a co-founder of TRICON (Pacific Regional Information-Library Consortium), a member of RLA (Russian Library Association, section of libraries of the institutions of higher education), and initiator of foundation of the Library Corporation in Khabarovsk.

There are about 1.6 million volumes; about 1 million documents, including electronic ones, are delivered to the readers. Annually the library serves over 22,000 readers; 700,000 attend the library (including the website) per year. Annually storage is increased by over 30,000 editions (more than 8,000 titles of literature).

The overall University Network consists of 4 information centers, operates a local network which contains 113, 56 Sun computer terminals, 10 touch screen kiosks and 5 servers PCs, situated in the library, and has Internet access. All the basic processes, relating to the assets acquisition and scientific document processing, are computer-assisted on the base of Automated Library Information System (ALIS) «RUSLAN» и «MARC SQL». Library serves readers in automated mode by the unified library card through bar-coding technology and integration. Catalog of Electronic Texts contains over 350 thousand records and available either to readers of PNU Scientific Library or to the remote users.

Publishing
Publishing activity is carried out by Pacific National University Publishing House, which was established in 1993. It consists of three sections: editorial, computer-generated, operative printing quality. PNU Publishing House is modernized with printing and bookbinding equipment.

The main purpose of PNU publishing activity is to provide scientific and educational process at the University through high-quality competitive publishing and printing products. PNU publishing production makes up about 10 percent of the PNU Scientific Library book fund. Every year the University Publishing-Library Council develops annual publications chart. It was established to coordinate activities of Publishing House, Scientific Library, Chairs and other PNU subdivisions.

Annually PNU Publishing House issues 10-12 monographs; 20-30 collection of scientific works; 35–45 titles of learning aids and textbooks; 120-150 titles of instructor's manual for all types of training courses and students' self-training; 20-40 thesis abstracts; 30-40 titles of earlier issued printings (reissue), etc.

A number of publications issued by PNU Publishing House were awarded at the 13th Far Eastern Fair-Exhibition "Printing House - 2009" (Vladivostok; October 2009). Three-volume edition Pacific National University, released to mark the 50th PNU anniversary, awarded a gold medal in nomination "Albums, Anniversary Editions". “Polylogue in contemporary architectural and artistic images (by examples of Korea, China, Japan)” and “Dispersal of borehole charges”, books issued by PNU Publishing House, received Diploma of the Fair-Exhibition in nomination «Monographs». Seven editions issued by PNU Publishing House were awarded at the Second Far Eastern Regional Contest “University Book 2009”. “Bulletin of PNU” awarded diploma for participation in the contest “The Best Scientific Publication” in nomination “Serial Edition”. PNU Publishing House is a member of the Publishing-Polygraphic Association of Universities of Russia since 2006.

International cooperation
PNU maintains international relationship with more than 120 foreign partners from 21 countries (at 68 universities). The most contracts were signed with countries of Russia's Far East Near Abroad - countries of the Asia-Pacific region, and especially the bordering countries - the People's Republic of China, Japan, Republic of Korea, Korean Democratic People's Republic. In these countries PNU maintains relationships with 71 partners: universities, research centres, production companies, administrative bodies.

According to long-term programs of international cooperation the University carries out activities in academic and students’ exchange, joint research, innovation and technological, educational, cultural and business projects. PNU also trains international students and international Ph.D. students and send Russian students for training abroad. During last years PNU issues Diplomas of Partner-countries under the program of educational cooperation.

PNU is one of the organizers and active participants of the International Forum of University Presidents of Far East and Siberia, Russia and north-eastern provinces of China. The 8th Forum took place in October 2009 in Dalian (China), where 45 Russian and 35 Chinese institutions of higher education were presented.

PNU has realized and is realizing the following international research and educational projects.
 Participates as one of organizers in the annual Inter-University Seminar of Asian Megacities (IUSAM).
 Arranges annual Russian-Chinese Symposium on New Materials and Technologies.
 Established the Russian-German Institute of Information and Computer Sciences at PNU in cooperation with Saarland University (Germany).
 Established the Laboratory high-precision measuring equipment named after Hideo Otsubo, PNU Honorary Dr. at PNU in cooperation with “Tokyo Seimitsu Co. Ltd” (Japan).
 Participates in realizing a number of the Russian-Chinese programs in architecture, urban planning and restoration of the Russian cultural heritage in Manchuria (Northeast China).
 Participates in the international programs of theoretical research in nuclear physics.
 Conducts Annual International Forums for lecturers, Ph.D. students and students of architectural and engineering majors – “New ideas of the new century” (NIoNC) at PNU.

Annually PNU trains more than 400 international students. More than 1600 international students, Master's students, Ph.D. students, and interns studied at PNU between 1989 and 2009 (80 percent of them are citizens of China).

References

External links
 Pacific National University
 img-20170628-wa0003.jpg (1200×675) (pnu.edu.ru) a bird's eye view
 https://archive.today/20121222185309/http://www.khstu.ru/rus/?menu=VirtualPano Virtual Tour at the Pacific National University
 https://www.webcitation.org/5nEAKXu1s?url=http://www.khstu.ru/ Website of PNU, ex-KSUT
 http://abitur.khstu.ru Information portal for applicants
 http://press.khstu.ru/ Website of Press-center, PNU
 http://ias.khstu.ru Website of Institute of Architecture and Civil Engineering, PNU
 http://iit.khstu.ru Website of Institute of Information Technologies, PNU
 http://technopolis.khstu.ru Newspaper, Pacific National University "Technopolis"
 Page of PNU on YouTube: https://www.youtube.com/TOGUTIME
 https://archive.today/20130702110138/http://iskra.far-east.info/ Photos of PNU

1958 establishments in the Soviet Union
Education in Khabarovsk
Universities in the Russian Far East
Educational institutions established in 1958
Buildings and structures in Khabarovsk Krai
Technical universities and colleges in Russia